The 2002–03 Belgian Hockey League season was the 83rd season of the Belgian Hockey League, the top level of ice hockey in Belgium. Five teams participated in the league, and Phantoms Deurne won the championship.

Regular season

Playoffs

Semifinals 
 Olympia Heist op den Berg - Chiefs Leuven 9:4/7:2
 Phantoms Deurne - HYC Herentals 8:2/4:5 OT

3rd place 
 HYC Herentals - Chiefs Leuven 9:10

Final 
 Olympia Heist op den Berg - Phantoms Deurne 2:4

References
Season on hockeyarchives.info

Belgian Hockey League
Belgian Hockey League seasons
Bel